Frank Rice (May 13, 1892 – January 9, 1936) was an American film actor.  He appeared in more than 120 films between 1912 and 1936. He was born in Muskegon, Michigan, and died in Los Angeles, California of hepatitis. Rice was educated in Portland, Oregon.

Selected filmography

 Richelieu (1914) - Huget
 A Man from Nowhere (1920) - Toby Jones
 Riders of the Law (1922) - Toby Jones
 The Forbidden Trail (1923) - Toby Jones
 Blood Test (1923)
 Desert Rider (1923) - Toby Jones
 The Ghost City (1923) - Sagebrush Hilton
 The Red Warning (1923) - Toby Jones
 Wanted by the Law (1924) - Jerry Hawkins
 The Galloping Ace (1924) - Knack Williams
 Wolves of the North (1924) - Dan Martin
 Dynamite Dan (1924) - Boss
 The Ridin' Kid from Powder River (1924) - Cal Huxley
 The Air Hawk (1924) - Hank
 The Cloud Rider (1925) - Hank Higgins
 Ridin' Pretty (1925) - Barb Wire
 Just Plain Folks (1925)
 Riders of Mystery (1925) - Jerry Jones
 Moccasins (1925) - 'Hard Tack' Avery, the sheriff
 The Speed Demon (1925) - Col. Warren's butler
 The Gold Rush (1925) - Man in Dance Hall (uncredited)
 Spook Ranch (1925) - Sheriff
 Two-Fisted Jones (1925) - Old Bill
 The Call of Courage (1925) - Slim
 The Fighting Buckaroo (1926) - Any Parker
 The Border Sheriff (1926) - Marsh Hewitt
 Daniel Boone Thru the Wilderness (1926) - Hank Vaughan
 The Fighting Peacemaker (1926) - Sheriff
 With Davy Crockett at the Fall of the Alamo (1926) - Lige Beardsley
 Flying High (1926) - Haines - the Mechanic
 Red Signals (1927) - The Professor
 Tom's Gang (1927) - Andy Barker
 Three Miles Up (1927) - Professor
 The Boy Rider (1927) - Hank Robbins
 Wolf Fangs (1927) - Pete
 The Slingshot Kid (1927) - Toby
 Won in the Clouds (1928) - Percy Hogan
 The Pinto Kid (1928) - Hank Robbins
 The Hound of Silver Creek (1928) - Slim Terwilliger
 A Thief in the Dark (1928)
 The Bantam Cowboy (1928) - Sidewinder Steve
Young Whirlwind  (1928) - Hank
 Rough Ridin' Red (1928) - Hank Robbins
 Headin' for Danger (1928) - Andy Johnson
Orphan of the Sage  (1928) - Hank Robbins
 The Vagabond Cub (1929) - Hank Robbins
 The Lawless Legion (1929) - Flapjack
 The Royal Rider (1929) - Wild West Show Member
 The Overland Telegraph (1929) - Easy
 Stairs of Sand (1929) - Stage Driver
 Pals of the Prairie (1929) - Hank Robbins
 The Wagon Master (1929) - Grasshoper Jim
 Parade of the West (1930) - Snuffy
 The Fighting Legion (1930) - Cloudy Jones
 The Arizona Kid (1930) - Stage Driver (uncredited)
 Mountain Justice (1930) - Man at Dance (uncredited)
 Song of the Caballero (1930) - Andrea
 Sons of the Saddle (1930) - Cowhand (uncredited)
 The Storm (1930) - Pool Player (uncredited)
 Shadow Ranch (1930) - Ranny Williams
 Whoopee! (1930) - Cowhand Cook (uncredited)
 The Conquering Horde (1931) - Spud Grogan
 Riders of the North (1931) - The Parson
 The Squaw Man (1931) - Grouchy
 Border Law (1931) - Thunder Rogers
 Freighters of Destiny (1931) - Rough
 Shotgun Pass (1931) - Sagebrush
 Corsair (1931) - Fish Face
 Mounted Fury (1931) - Sandy McNab
 The False Madonna (1931) - Bus Driver (uncredited)
 The Sunset Trail (1932) - Taterbug Watson
 The Menace (1932) - Jim (uncredited)
 Polly of the Circus (1932) - Billboard Poster (uncredited)
 Love Affair (1932) - Eddie - Aviator (uncredited)
 The Wet Parade (1932) - Expectant Father / Bootleg Thug (uncredited)
 Sky Bride (1932) - House Detective (uncredited)
 Strangers of the Evening (1932) - Policeman (uncredited)
 Mystery Ranch (1932) - Tex - Barfly (uncredited)
 Hello Trouble (1932) - Hardpan - the Cook
 Horse Feathers (1932) - Doorman at Speakeasy (uncredited)
 Pack Up Your Troubles (1932) - Perkins (uncredited)
 Tess of the Storm Country (1932) - Thug (uncredited)
 Forbidden Trail (1932) - Sheriff Hibbs
 Robbers' Roost (1932) - Daniels (uncredited)
 The Thundering Herd (1933) - Blacksmith
 Phantom Thunderbolt (1933) - Nevady
 Somewhere in Sonora (1933) - Riley
 King of the Arena (1933) - Tin Star
 Horse Play (1933) - Farmer (uncredited)
 The Fiddlin' Buckaroo (1933) - Banty
 Her First Mate (1933) - Sailor on Whaler (uncredited)
 The Trail Drive (1933) - Thirsty
 Penthouse (1933) - Unknown Man on Phone (uncredited)
 Wheels of Destiny (1934) - Pinwheel
 David Harum (1934) - Robinson (uncredited)
 Wharf Angel (1934) - Sailor on 'The Coyote' (uncredited)
 The Fighting Ranger (1934) - Thunder, Texas Ranger
 The Last Round-Up (1934) - Shrimp
 Charlie Chan's Courage (1934) - Prospector
 The Red Rider (1934, Serial) - Deputy Harp Harris [Chs. 1-2, 15] (uncredited)
 The Notorious Sophie Lang (1934) - Cop (uncredited)
 You Belong to Me (1934) - Stagehand (uncredited)
 Wagon Wheels (1934) - Settler (uncredited)
 Belle of the Nineties (1934) - Best Man at Wedding (uncredited)
 Terror of the Plains (1934) - Banty - Tom's Sidekick
 One Hour Late (1934) - Engineer (uncredited)
 Loser's End (1935) - Amos Butts
 Ruggles of Red Gap (1935) - Hank Adams (uncredited)
 Princess O'Hara (1935) - Laramie Pink (uncredited)
 Stone of Silver Creek (1935) - Tom Lucas
 Public Hero No. 1 (1935) - Cab Driver (uncredited)
 Border Brigands (1935) - Rocky O'Leary, RCMP
 Hard Rock Harrigan (1935) - McClintock - Superindendant
 Trails of the Wild (1935) - Missouri
 Cheers of the Crowd (1935) - (uncredited)
 The Public Menace (1935) - Policeman (uncredited)
 Powdersmoke Range (1935) - Sourdough Jenkins (uncredited)
 She Couldn't Take It (1935) - Milkman (uncredited)
 Barbary Coast (1935) - Miner (uncredited)
 Valley of Wanted Men (1935) - Ned (Storekeeper)
 The Ivory-Handled Gun (1935) - Pike
 Nevada (1935) - Shorty
 Too Tough to Kill (1935) - Swede Mulhauser (uncredited)
 The Oregon Trail (1936) - Red
 The Trail of the Lonesome Pine (1936) - Zeke Denker

References

External links

1892 births
1936 deaths
People from Muskegon, Michigan
Deaths from hepatitis
American male film actors
20th-century American male actors
Male actors from Michigan
Male Western (genre) film actors